The Community of Democratic Choice Youth Forum (CDC Youth Forum) is an international organisation registered in Riga, Latvia. It aims to promote partnership and dialogue among the youth of the region of the Community of Democratic Choice.

Founded under the name Youth Forum of Europe's New Democracies, it arose from a youth forum that was part of the Vilnius Conference 2006 of the Community of Democratic Choice. The youth forum consists of members from Armenia, Azerbaijan, Belarus, Slovenia, Bulgaria, Estonia, Germany, Georgia, Latvia, Lithuania, Moldova, Poland, Romania, Russia, Ukraine and United Kingdom. The main task of the forum is the promotion of democracy, human rights and the rule of law. 

In March 2007 delegates of the forum met in Tallinn, Estonia to institutionalise the forum. By this the Forum was renamed into Community of Democratic Choice Youth Forum.

Foundation 
For their meeting in Vilnius, Lithuania the head of states of the Community of Democratic Choice (CDC) added an intellectuals' forum, an NGO forum and a youth forum to their summit. The youth forum was composed by 27 young Europeans from 13 countries. In its resolution it declared the foundation of the "Youth Forum of Europe's New Democracies". Nine month after the first meeting delegates of the forum met in Tallinn, Estonia to institutionalize the forum and give it a legal basis. By this the forum changed its name to CDC Youth Forum to stress out the ties to the Community of Democratic Choice.

Targets 
The Forum wants to inform about the CDC, its values and goals among a broader public. Thus it tries to promote and strengthen democratic values, human rights and civil society in the region of the CDC. Under the label of "Your Voice" it seeks comprehensive discussions about democracy and its values among youth via a dialogue among youth.

Meetings 

 May, 2006: Vilnius, Lithuania
 March 2007: Tallinn, Estonia
 April 2007: Lviv, Ukraine
 March 2008: Nottingham, United Kingdom

See also 
 Community of Democratic Choice

External links 
 CDC Youth Forum

Community of Democratic Choice